Presidential line of succession may refer to:

Brazilian presidential line of succession
Colombian presidential line of succession
Dominican presidential line of succession
Philippine presidential line of succession
Sri Lankan presidential line of succession
United States presidential line of succession
Uruguayan presidential line of succession